The Robertson Drugstore is a historic commercial building at Spring Street and Arch Avenue in central Searcy, Arkansas.  It is a two-story brick structure with basically vernacular style.  It was built about 1860, and is the city's only commercial building to survive from the pre-Civil War period.  It was the home to the city's first drugstore, and is the oldest commercial building in White County.

The building was listed on the National Register of Historic Places in 1991.

See also
National Register of Historic Places listings in White County, Arkansas

References

Commercial buildings on the National Register of Historic Places in Arkansas
Commercial buildings completed in 1860
National Register of Historic Places in Searcy, Arkansas
1860 establishments in Arkansas